Marlene Maska, formerly Marlene Hendy, is a member of the Legislative Council of the Isle of Man, having been elected in March 2018.

References

Year of birth missing (living people)
Living people
Members of the Legislative Council of the Isle of Man
Manx women in politics